Hold On Tight may refer to:

Albums
Hold On Tight (Solomon Burke and De Dijk album), by Solomon Burke and De Dijk, 2010
Hold On Tight, by Kevin Chase, 2011
Hold On Tight (Hey Monday album), by Hey Monday, 2008
Hold On Tight, by Sweet Comfort Band, 1980

Songs
"Hold On Tight" (Archie Roach song), 1997
"Hold On Tight" (Electric Light Orchestra song), 1981
"Hold On Tight" (R3hab and Conor Maynard song), 2018
"Hold On Tight" (Samantha Fox song), 1986
"Hold On Tight", by Britney Spears from Britney Jean
"Hold On Tight", by Marilyn

See also
Hold Tight (disambiguation)
Hold Me Tight (disambiguation)